Robert Stephens (1931–1995) was an English actor.

Robert Stephens may also refer to:

 Robert Stephens, one of three pseudonyms for Robert Kellard (1915–1981), American actor
 Robert Stephens (historian) (1665–1732), English historian, appointed historiographer royal in 1727
 Robert D. Stephens (born 1955), American amateur astronomer and photometrist
 Robert F. Stephens (1927–2002), justice of the Kentucky Supreme Court
 Robert Grier Stephens Jr. (1913–2003), American politician; United States Representative from Georgia
 Robert L. Stephens (1921–1984), American test pilot
 Robert Neilson Stephens (1867–1906), American novelist and playwright
 Robert Stephens (Geek Squad), American entrepreneur; founder of Geek Squad

See also
 Robert Stevens (disambiguation)
 Robert Stephen (disambiguation)
 Robert Estienne (1503–1559), aka Robert Stephens, French printer, and publisher